Thomas Waterman may refer to:

Thomas G. Waterman (1788–1862), American lawyer and politician from New York
Thomas D. Waterman (born 1959), justice on the Iowa Supreme Court
Thomas Waterman (MP), Member of Parliament (MP) for Yorkshire

See also
Thomas Waterman Wood (1823–1903), American painter